A Galway City Council election was held in Galway in Ireland on 24 May 2019 as part of that year's local elections. All 18 councillors were elected for a five-year term of office from 3 local electoral areas (LEAs) by single transferable vote. Following a recommendation of the 2018 LEA boundary review committee, the only change to the LEAs and seat distribution used in the 2014 elections was to move the electoral division of Claddagh from the West LEA to the Central LEA in line with population changes revealed by the 2016 census.

This is expected to be the last election to Galway City Council as plans were announced in 2018 to merge the City and County Councils by 2021.

Fianna Fáil became the largest party on the City Council gaining 2 seats in the process. Fine Gael lost 1 seat despite slightly increasing their vote. The Green Party emerged as the big winners winning 2 seats; 1 in each of Galway City Central and Galway City West and a nearly 5 fivefold increase in voteshare. Following two recounts the Social Democrats held onto a seat in Galway City East at the expense of Sinn Féin, and lost a seat in City Central to the Greens. Sinn Féin lost all their seats as their vote collapsed almost in half. To a significant extent the rise in support for both the Social Democrats and the Greens contributed to the loss for Sinn Féin.

Results by party

Results by local electoral area

Galway City Central

Galway City East

Galway City West

Changes since 2019 Local Elections
†Galway City West Green Party Cllr Pauline O'Reilly was elected to the Seanad on the Labour Panel in the April 2020 Seanad election. Niall Murphy was chosen to fill the vacancy.
††Galway City Central Fianna Fáil Cllr Ollie Crowe was elected to the Seanad on the Industrial and Commercial Panel in the April 2020 Seanad election. Imelda Byrne was co-opted to fill the vacancy on 8 June.
†††Galway City East Social Democrats Cllr Owen Hanley resigned from the council on 4 January 2023 following allegations made on social media about his behaviour.

Footnotes

Sources

References

2019 Irish local elections
2019